Boroșneu Mare is a commune in Covasna County, Transylvania, Romania composed of six villages: Boroșneu Mare, Boroșneu Mic (Kisborosnyó), Dobolii de Sus (Feldoboly), Leț (Lécfalva), Țufalău (Cófalva) and Valea Mică (Kispatak).

Demographics

The commune has an absolute Székely Hungarian majority. According to the 2002 census, it had a population of 3,074 of whom 95.48% or 2,935 were Hungarian.

Leț

Leț village, which lies on the Dalnic River, had 650 people in 2002, of whom 557 were Székely. It was settled during the Stone Age. Evidence of multicoloured painting has been found which exhibits strong Bulgarian traits. The village was first mentioned in a document of 1333, when it was destroyed by the Mongols. It is the site of the Diet of Lécfalva (25 October 1600), notable for being the first time the word "Unitarian" was used. In 1960, the local manor was demolished.

References

Communes in Covasna County
Localities in Transylvania